"Shiver" is a song by British rock band Coldplay. British record producer Ken Nelson and Coldplay produced the track for their debut album Parachutes. Lead singer Chris Martin admitted that "Shiver" was written for a specific woman, from whom the media has generated several speculations. The song contains influences attributed to American singer-songwriter Jeff Buckley, whom Coldplay's early influences were drawn from. The song's lyrics are a reference to Martin's unrequited love.

The song was released as the album's lead single in the United Kingdom and second in the United States following the single "Yellow". The single reached number 35 on the UK Singles Chart, and its critical reception has been generally positive.

Production and composition
"Shiver" was written two years before its release. Martin allegedly wrote the song while thinking of Australian singer-songwriter Natalie Imbruglia, the woman with whom he was linked at the time, but he later denied it was about her. Other accounts have claimed that Imbruglia was indeed not Martin's inspiration for writing the song. Instead, he appeared to have been inspired by girlfriends in his teenage years and early 20s. Martin actually wrote the song on a "glum" day, when he felt he would never find the right woman for him. He described it as something of a "stalking song", admitting he wrote it for a specific woman. In addition, Martin wrote the song while listening to music of Buckley, and had claimed it is their "most blatant rip-off song".

"Shiver" was recorded in Rockfield Studios in Wales, United Kingdom, where the band was booked by A&R representative Dan Keeling to begin working on the band's debut album, Parachutes. Keeling was disappointed with the early demos presented to him, saying it "didn't have any of their passion, their energy", a result of the band's freshly resolved internal pressure in the time. Keeling deemed the demos as "limp" and asked the band to redo it. Smaller parts of the song were recorded at Parr Street Studios in Liverpool, England, where the band relocated after Christmas in 1999.

The song was produced by Coldplay and British record producer Ken Nelson. As with most songs in the album, Nelson used an analogue desk in recording "Shiver". The guitar was re-dubbed in search of perfection, while Martin de-tuned his guitar to easily generate complex chord sequences. Martin's vocals were recorded in more than one take, but the band chose the one with a single take.

"Shiver" is in the alternative rock genre. A review claims that Coldplay's indie rock inclinations are obvious in the song. "Shiver" has been perceived to have influences of Buckley, whom Coldplay's early song influences were drawn from. Martin later said of the song that it was "a blatant Jeff Buckley attempt, not quite as good, that's what I think".

The song is written in B major with a tempo of 78 beats per minute.

Release and reception
"Shiver" is one of the older songs in Coldplay's catalogue, and had been performed at their early concerts in 1999. Later, it was initially released as an EP in the spring of 2000. It was released as the album's lead single in the United Kingdom on 6 March 2000, months before the release of the album. The single had been picked up for B-play lists on some European prominent radio stations. In the United States, the song was released as the second single, following "Yellow", on 10 April 2001. Website IGN posted a video at the 2008 Games Convention in Leipzig, Germany, revealing "Shiver" to be part of the song list in the video game Guitar Hero World Tour.

The single's reception was generally positive. It reached number 35 on the UK Singles Chart. It also reached number 26 at the US Billboard Hot Modern Rock Tracks. The song remains, to this day, an audience favourite in live performances. It has earned the band praise from critics. Adrian Denning, in his review of the album, wrote, "'Shiver' has a vocal that could be Jeff Buckley influenced, the soaring vocals are a joy over a reasonably guitar rock-based instrumental track." A review by David DeVoe in Hybridmagazine.com reads, "'Shiver' is a delightfully laid back tune, full of that great guitar sound that I have come to appreciate this band for." Spencer Owen of Pitchfork noted "It's the only truly decent song on Parachutes, but simultaneously, it's the only one that blatantly shows its influences" NME (#63) and Spin (#24) included the track on their "Best Songs of 2000" lists.

Music video 
The music video for "Shiver" was directed by English film director and cinematographer Grant Gee. It features Coldplay performing in a small studio. The yellow globe featured on the Parachutes cover can be seen on top of an amplifier in the video. The music video received "strong exposure" on MTV. In 2003, "Shiver" was featured on Coldplay's live album Live 2003.

Track listing

Personnel
 Chris Martin – lead vocals, acoustic guitar
 Jonny Buckland – lead guitar 
 Guy Berryman – bass guitar 
 Will Champion – drums

Charts

References

External links
 

2000 singles
Coldplay songs
Parlophone singles
Songs written by Guy Berryman
Songs written by Jonny Buckland
Songs written by Will Champion
Songs written by Chris Martin
2000 songs
Song recordings produced by Ken Nelson (British record producer)